Sir Thomas Shirley, 1st Baronet (30 December 1727 – 18 February 1800) was a British colonial governor and military officer.  The son of William Shirley, a politically well-connected colonial administrator who served for many years as governor of the Province of Massachusetts Bay, Shirley entered the military, serving in the Louisbourg expedition his father organised in 1745.  During the Seven Years' War he served on Menorca and in the 1761 Capture of Belle Île.

Shirley succeeded his father as Governor of the Bahamas in 1768, and was appointed Governor of Dominica in 1774, a post he held until the island was captured in 1778 by French forces during the American War of Independence.  He was thereafter (1781) named Governor of the Leeward Islands, and awarded a baronetcy in 1786 as "Shirley of Oat Hall" . He was promoted to lieutenant-general on 18 October 1793 and general on 8 January 1798. He died in Bath, England in 1800 and was buried in Bath Abbey. 

Fort Shirley in Cabrits National Park, Dominica, was named for him, as were military installations in Antigua, then-capital of the Leewards. Shirley is often incorrectly described as having been born in Boston, or in 1769.  He was, however, born prior to his father's departure for Massachusetts.

See also
Nelson's Dockyard

Notes

References
Essex Review
History of the British West Indies
 (listed birthdate of 1769 is in all likelihood incorrect, given other facts about his life, such as the 1774 birth of his son)
 Schutz, John A. William Shirley, King's Governor of Massachusetts (1961)
 Shirley, Evelyn Philip. Stemmata Shirleiana (1873) (Sir Thomas Shirley is at pages 322-323)
 Sugden, John. Nelson: A Dream of Glory, 1758-1797 (2005)

1727 births
1800 deaths
British Army personnel of the American Revolutionary War
British Army generals
Baronets in the Baronetage of Great Britain
British governors of the Bahamas
Governors of Dominica
Governors of the Leeward Islands
English emigrants to British North America